Roman Sergeyevich Melyoshin (born June 23, 1983 in Petropavl) is an amateur Kazakhstani Greco-Roman wrestler, who played for the men's middleweight category. He won a gold medal for his division at the 2006 Asian Games in Doha, Qatar, and bronze at the 2009 Asian Wrestling Championships in Pattaya, Thailand.

Melyoshin represented Kazakhstan at the 2008 Summer Olympics, where he competed for the men's 74 kg class. He defeated Australia's Hassan Shahsavan in the preliminary round of sixteen, before losing out the quarterfinal match to Belarus' Aleh Mikhalovich, with a three-set technical score (1–1, 1–1, 1–2), and a classification point score of 1–3.

References

External links
Profile – International Wrestling Database
NBC 2008 Olympics profile

1983 births
Living people
Olympic wrestlers of Kazakhstan
Wrestlers at the 2008 Summer Olympics
People from Petropavl
Asian Games medalists in wrestling
Wrestlers at the 2006 Asian Games
Wrestlers at the 2010 Asian Games
Kazakhstani male sport wrestlers
Asian Games gold medalists for Kazakhstan
Medalists at the 2006 Asian Games
Asian Wrestling Championships medalists
21st-century Kazakhstani people